Nynorsk User of the Year is a prize awarded by the Nynorsk Cultural Center at the Nynorsk Festival every year. The prize is awarded to the "persons or institutions that demonstrate the ability to break language and cultural conventions on the use of Nynorsk, which through their example or practical work make it easier to be Nynorsk users, or which create a greater general understanding of Nynorsk." Since 2006, the prize has consisted of NOK 50,000 and a graphic print, and on two occasions a copy of the game Dialektspelet. In 2014, the prize was NOK 100,000, split equally between the two prize recipients. The competition is headed by the Nynorsk Cultural Center, which also serves as the jury.

Prizewinners
 2000: Karl Arne Utgård
 2001: Gerd Kjellaug Berge
 2002: Ringstabekk School, Bærum
 2003: Martin Toft
 2004: Side Brok
 2005: Kjartan Fløgstad
 2006: Kari Traa
 2007: Guri Vesaas
 2008: Åmliavisa
 2009: Ottar Rekkedal
 2010: Maria Parr
 2011: Linda Sæbø
 2012: Ingvild Bryn and Arill Riise 
 2013: Gunnar Skirbekk 
 2014: Aasmund Nordstoga and Odd Nordstoga
 2015: Jorunn Veiteberg
 2016: Martine Rørstad Sand
 2017: Morten Haga Lunde
 2018: John-Ragnar Aarset
 2019: Floke and Balanzera (Hairdressing chains)
 2020: Geir Sverre Braut
 2021: Bergen municipality, represented by the mayor Marte Mjøs Persen

References

Norwegian awards
Nynorsk